Zir-e Zard or Zir Zard may refer to:
 Zir Zard, Fars
 Zir-e Zard, Bagh-e Malek, Khuzestan Province
 Zir-e Zard, Ramhormoz, Khuzestan Province